Kagarumo is a settlement in Kenya's Central Province, located 58 km (36 mi) from Nairobi.

References 

Populated places in Central Province (Kenya)